Zhang Changning (born 6 November 1995) is a Chinese indoor volleyball and beach volleyball player. She is a member of China women's national volleyball team. On club level, she plays for Jiangsu Zenith Steel.

Personal life 
She was born in Changzhou and raised in Nanjing. She is the daughter of Zhang Yousheng, a former player of China men's national volleyball team, and Jiang Hanqiu, a college physical education teacher. Her elder brother Zhang Chen is a current player of China men's national volleyball team. Along with her Jiangsu teammates Hui Ruoqi and Gong Xiangyu, she attended Nanjing Normal University. She married basketball player, Wu Guanxi, on 30 July, 2022.

Beach volleyball 
Although she started as an indoor player, she was offered to join the national beach volleyball team in 2009. As a beach volleyball player she teamed with Ji Linjun in 2009, and with Ma Yuanyuan in 2010 and 2011 winning the silver medal at the 2011 Asian Beach Volleyball Championship. Later in 2011 she competed with Ding Jingjing at the Visa FIVB Beach Volleyball International.

2013 ban 
In early 2013 she decided to switch from beach volleyball to indoor volleyball. She was pressured by national and provincial volleyball bureaus to reconsider her decision. Refusing to return to beach volleyball, she was banned from competition and faced a possible early retirement from her athletic career. Due to massive backlash from provincial media, and because of the Jiangsu team's historically low performance in the 2013-2014 season, the ban was lifted on December 29, 2013 and she has since been playing for Jiangsu in the CVL.

Indoor volleyball 
In 2014, she was promoted by Coach Lang Ping to the national team. She represented China at the 2014 Asian Games. She was part of the Team China that won gold at the 2015 FIVB Volleyball Women's World Cup. She represented China at the 2016 Summer Olympics playing as an outside hitter and an opposite hitter and won the gold medal. 
She participated at the  2019 Montreux Volley Masters,

She was voted CVL's MVP and Most Popular Player in the 2015-2016 season.

References

Sportspeople from Changzhou
Volleyball players from Jiangsu
Chinese women's volleyball players
Olympic gold medalists for China in volleyball
2016 Olympic gold medalists for China
Volleyball players at the 2016 Summer Olympics
Asian Games medalists in volleyball
Volleyball players at the 2014 Asian Games
Medalists at the 2014 Asian Games
Asian Games silver medalists for China
Chinese female beach volleyball players
1995 births
Living people
Opposite hitters
Outside hitters
Volleyball players at the 2020 Summer Olympics
21st-century Chinese women